The Godfather Saga is a 1977 American television miniseries that combines The Godfather and The Godfather Part II into one film. It originally aired on NBC over four consecutive nights (one three-hour segment and three two-hour segments) in November 1977. The Godfather Saga is also known as The Godfather: The Complete Novel for Television, The Godfather: A Novel for Television, The Godfather Novella, The Godfather 1901–1959: The Complete Epic, and The Godfather Epic (on HBO). The television version was the basis for a shorter, 1981 video release known as The Godfather 1902–1959: The Complete Epic. Following the release of The Godfather Part III in 1990, a third unified version was released to video in 1992 entitled The Godfather Trilogy: 1901–1980.

Film structure 
Francis Ford Coppola asked his editor Barry Malkin to make a seven-hour version for television; Coppola reportedly did this project to raise money for Apocalypse Now, which was severely over-budget at the time. The resulting film was in chronological order. The Godfather Part II had cut back and forth between scenes in the early 1900s and the late 1950s, and was therefore both a prequel and a sequel to The Godfather. Malkin also toned down the violence, sex, and language for a television audience.

The television film incorporated additional footage not included in the original films, including Don Fanucci being attacked by street thugs, Vito Corleone's first encounter with Hyman Roth, Vito killing two of the mafiosi who worked for Don Ciccio and were instrumental in his family's death, Michael Corleone's reunion with his father after his return from Sicily, Sonny Corleone's taking charge of the family after his father is severely wounded, and Michael's vengeance upon Fabrizio for killing Apollonia. The previously deleted scenes totaled almost 75 minutes.

Hal Erickson summarized the results as follows, "While this rearrangement was reasonably coherent, the rhythm and pacing of the original theatrical versions of the two films was severely damaged. The inclusion of scenes previously removed from the theatrical prints also stretched out what was already an overlong project. Even allowing for the achievement of pulling off this gargantuan editing assignment, The Godfather Saga is a lumpy affair which seems to stop and start at irregular intervals and never truly picks up momentum."

Nielsen ratings 
According to the entry in Les Brown's Encyclopedia of Television, the Nielsen ratings for the special were supposedly not as high as expected, possibly because both films had already aired (albeit separately) on NBC in previous years.

Re-release 
On March 3, 2012, the American cable television channel AMC marked the 40th anniversary of the original theatrical release of The Godfather by re-broadcasting The Godfather Saga. It marked the first time the Saga was broadcast in high definition. This showing also reinstated the violence that had previously been removed for its original broadcast.

The Godfather 1902–1959: The Complete Epic 
The Godfather 1902–1959: The Complete Epic is a reduced, 386-minute version of The Godfather Saga (434 minutes) that was released to video in 1981. Unlike the Saga, which was presented in four segments (each with opening and closing credits), the Epic is presented as a single  segment. Lucia Bozzola wrote of this version, "With the freedom of home video, The Complete Epic reinstated the violence that had been edited for television; free of commercial breaks, the narrative drive of Part I was mostly restored, but the impact of Part II was still muted by the separation of Vito's rise from Michael's descent." In January 2016, HBO aired the Epic in its uncut and uncensored format, later making it available on its streaming platforms. The HBO showing contained most of the known deleted scenes, thereby lengthening the runtime of the Epic from its video release to 423 minutes. This version carries the title Mario Puzo's The Godfather: The Complete Epic 1901-1959. It was available to watch through Amazon under the title The Godfather Epic, but is currently unavailable to purchase. To date, this version has never been released to DVD, Blu-ray, or 4K UHD disc.

The Godfather Trilogy: 1901–1980 

Following the release of The Godfather Part III in 1990, Coppola, Barry Malkin, and Walter Murch edited the three Godfather movies into chronological order to make the film The Godfather Trilogy: 1901–1980. As had the earlier compilations, this film incorporated scenes that are not part of the theatrical releases. It was released on VHS and laserdisc in 1992; it has not been released on DVD, and is now rare. The total run time for this version is 583 minutes (9 hours, 43 minutes). There were reviews of this version of the film that were favorable. A Time review reads, "This trilogy has a novelistic density, a rueful, unhurried lyricism and a depth that, singly, the films could not achieve. Altogether glorious."

Additional scenes 
Several additional scenes not shown in theaters were added to the Saga, Epic, and Trilogy.

The Godfather additional scenes 
After Vito agrees to help Amerigo Bonasera avenge the beating of his daughter, Vito whistles to Sonny and asks if he was paying attention. Sonny confirms that he was. (Exclusive to the Saga only)
After Vito tells Hagen to go to California, Hagen tells him that the hospital called and the dying Genco Abbandando, Vito's previous consigliere, will not last the night. Vito tells Sonny to bring all his sons (including Michael and Johnny) to pay their respects to Genco and for Fredo to drive the big car. (Saga and Trilogy only)
After Connie's wedding reception, Vito, his sons, and Johnny Fontane go to the hospital to visit Genco, where Vito calls Michael's military decorations "Christmas ribbons" and tells him that he has plans for him after he leaves the military and finishes school. Genco asks that Vito stay with him and scare away death to which Vito says that he has no such power. After a short conversation, Genco becomes weak, and Vito motions for his sons to leave the room, himself staying behind while Genco dies. (Saga and Trilogy only)
Before Hagen and Jack Woltz start talking, Woltz holds a birthday party for a young actress named Janie, and presents her with a pony as a gift. Present at the gathering are the girl's mother and several others involved with her current film. After Woltz kicks Tom out after dinner, he walks to the exit, looks up, and sees Janie, crying at the top of the staircase, being retrieved by her mother; the implication is that Woltz raped her. (Saga and Trilogy only)
There is additional footage of Tom, Sonny and Vito discussing the Woltz situation before the horse head scene. Vito asks if Woltz is "so tough", to which Tom responds, "You mean is he a Sicilian? Forget about it." Vito then asks if the story between Woltz and Janie is true, and calls Woltz's pedophilia an "infamia". Vito tells Tom to summon Luca Brasi to "see if we can find a way to reason with this Mr. Jack Woltz." (Saga only)
Michael and Kay are in a New York hotel bed, getting a wake-up call at 3 p.m. They are supposed to go to the Corleone residence, but Michael does not want to go yet. He calls the mansion, and Kay pretends to be the long-distance operator, calling collect for "Mr. Michael Corleone". Tom "accepts" the charges, and Michael tells Hagen that they're "stuck in New Hampshire", where Kay's family lives. After Tom hangs up, they giggle about their trick on Tom, and roll onto the floor between the beds they have pushed together. This scene occurs before Fredo gets the car for Vito.
There is some short extra footage of Luca Brasi walking through the hotel hallways before meeting with the Tattaglias. He sees a neon sign turn off, which signals him it is OK to enter the bar. (Saga and Trilogy only)
After the Don is shot, Sonny gets a phone call from a detective informing him about his father's condition. Sonny then tries to call Tom, but his wife Theresa says he is not home. After he hangs up, some gunshots ring out. Sonny retrieves a gun from his dresser drawer and goes to check it out, at which point the scene ends and Clemenza knocks on the door, resuming the theatrical footage. (Saga and Trilogy only)
After Sonny gets the call from Virgil Sollozzo informing him that Tom Hagen has been abducted, he goes to tell his mother that Vito has been shot. He then calls Sal Tessio and tells him to bring fifty of his men over. He tries to call Luca Brasi, but he does not answer, as Tattaglia has killed him. (Saga and Trilogy only)
After Michael calls Sonny about Vito's shooting, there is additional footage near the phone booth of Michael telling Kay to go back the hotel. (Saga and Trilogy only)
There is some short extra footage of Michael in the car arriving at the mall and being cleared to enter by the guards. (Saga and Trilogy only)
After Michael meets Peter Clemenza, he asks Hagen's wife Theresa how he is. The two of them go in to see Sonny (who's with Tessio). After discussing how Paulie Gatto, not Clemenza, was the traitor, Hagen enters the room. (Saga and Trilogy only)
Before Clemenza leaves the house with Paulie, he and Rocco Lampone talk about Clemenza's car with the wooden bumpers. Clemenza gives Rocco the gun he is to use to "make his bones" by killing Gatto. (Saga and Trilogy only)
After they leave Clemenza's driveway, they make a stop "to call Sonny". Clemenza eats a meal and buys cannoli while Lampone and Gatto wait in the car. (Saga and Trilogy only)
When Michael is hiding in Sicily, there is a scene in which his bodyguard Fabrizio asks him about New York, and whether it is true that he is the son of a Mafia boss. Fabrizio then asks Michael if he could be his bodyguard in America. This scene happens just before they meet Apollonia.
In Sicily, after Michael tells Don Tommasino that they are going to Corleone, Michael and his bodyguards see a procession of Communists marching through the hills. When asked, Fabrizio tells they are going to Portella della Ginestra. (Saga and Trilogy only)
There is some short extra footage of Michael and bodyguards walking through Corleone, before he says "Where have all the men gone?"
Before they are on the road as the G.I.s pass by, Michael visits his father's birthplace and he asks a woman if there are any family/friends of the Andolini family around. She says they have all left and gone overseas. (Saga and Trilogy only)
After Hagen makes the call to Bonasera following Sonny's murder, Bonasera dresses and contemplates what task Vito is going to ask him to do. (Exclusive to the Saga only)
After Apollonia is killed in the explosion, there is a short scene of Michael, in shock and in bed, muttering to Tommasino and Apollonia's mother: "Apollonia..?" / Tommasino: "Dead." / Michael: "Fabrizio..? Get me Fabrizio..."
After Connie hangs up the phone following a fight with her husband Carlo Rizzi, she walks into the bathroom where Carlo is showering. She confronts him about the "whore"; he ignores the comment and tells her to make him dinner. The subsequent footage is slightly tailored to fit the standard scene, and a couple of extra lines are added where they were not before. (Saga and Trilogy only)
Before Hagen asks Michael why he is being replaced as consigliere, there is some short extra footage. There is also some short extra footage after Michael says "You're out, Tom." These two short scenes talk about Al Neri. (Saga and Trilogy only)
After Hagen leaves the room, Vito takes Michael out to the garden through the French doors in the study. (Exclusive to the Saga only)
The original ending of the film showed Kay praying at an altar while the credits were shown. The scene, though faithful to the original novel, was used only as a final of The Godfather Saga.

The Godfather Part II additional scenes 
The following scenes are listed chronologically.
After Vito's brother Paolo is shot, two of Don Ciccio's thugs arrive at the Andolini home looking for Vito. His mother calls a Vito a "Little Baccala, not worth worrying about".
When Vito and Genco go backstage at the theater, there is additional footage before and after the scene where Don Fanucci grabs a young girl. Fanucci tells the theater owner that he should have more Sicilian songs and begins to sing. (Exclusive to the Saga only)
There is a scene before Vito gets fired from Abbandando's Grosseria: While Vito is delivering groceries, he sees three punks over on 9th Street assaulting Fanucci, and they cut his throat "from ear to ear...to scare him". Genco and Vito discuss how much power Fanucci actually has.
There is added footage at the beginning of the scene where young Vito and Clemenza are drinking coffee, talking about the carpet Vito is to steal. (Saga and Trilogy only)
After the new carpet is installed, Vito, Clemenza, and Tessio meet up with a gunsmith, Augustino Coppola, and his young son, Carmine Coppola. This is where Clemenza sells his guns.
We then see young Clemenza hawking stolen dresses door-to-door for $5 a piece. He makes one married woman an offer (two for one), and presumably has sex with her. Clemenza tells Vito to bring the rest of the dresses to Dadine's Store, where Dadine will turn it over to the wholesaler. While they are driving, Fanucci hops aboard Vito's truck.
There is added footage at the end of Fanucci's talk with Vito in the truck. (Saga and Trilogy only)
There is added footage at the beginning of the scene where Vito, Clemenza and Tessio are eating spaghetti at Vito's house discussing how to pay Fanucci. (Saga and Trilogy only)
There is added footage at the beginning of Vito's meeting with Signora Colombo. (Saga and Trilogy only)
There is added footage during Vito's talk with Signor Roberto on the street. (Saga and Trilogy only)
There is added footage before we see Signor Roberto at Vito's office. He is seen entering through the garage area where he carefully asks for "Don Vito Corleone".
After Signor Roberto lowers Signora Colombo's rent, Vito sees Clemenza, who has found "a kid good with cars", to fix the truck. His name is Hyman Suchowsky, but Clemenza calls him "Johnny Lips". Vito suggests that Suchowsky change his name; Suchowsky then begins calling himself Hyman Roth.
In a trip back to Sicily, there is additional footage of Vito's family exiting the train and walking with a small band. (Saga and Trilogy only)
While in Sicily, Vito finds and kills two of Don Ciccio's retainers (Mosca and Strollo) before he goes with Tommasino to kill Don Ciccio.
There is additional footage of Vito and his family at the train station leaving Sicily. (Exclusive to the Saga only)
There is footage of Michael walking on a pier in Lake Tahoe playing with a dog. (Exclusive to the Saga only)
There is footage of Anthony's First Communion ceremony. (Saga and Epic only)
At the beginning of Anthony's party, there is added footage of singing on the grandstand, and in the parking lot. We also see Anthony walking up to the button men, and stopping as Kay calls after him. (Saga and Trilogy only)
There is a scene of Fredo and his wife Deanna in the parking lot. Deanna is already drunk and Fredo does not want Michael to see her that way.
At the communion party, Sonny's daughter, Francesca, comes to see Michael for his blessing to marry Gardner Shaw, of whom Michael approves.
After Francesca and Gardner leave, he asks Francesca's brother, Santino Jr., how he is doing in football. (Exclusive to the Saga only)
There is a scene (after Michael's meeting with Sen. Pat Geary) in which Al Neri is talking to Michael (with Hagen and Lampone) and they are looking at pictures of Fabrizio. They explain that he was brought over illegally from Sicily by Don Barzini.
After Michael and Kay are dancing in the communion party, we see Fabrizio ("Fred Vincent"), leaving his pizzeria in Buffalo, New York, and starting his car, at which point a previously planted car bomb explodes. He stumbles out of the car, then dies. This was Michael's vengeance upon Fabrizio for killing Apollonia.
There is added footage leading up to Frank Pentangeli drinking from the garden hose in which he asks a waiter for a glass of wine or a beer.
After the family sits down to eat, we see Pentangeli sitting and drinking wine with Anthony. He gives Anthony a $100 bill. (Saga and Trilogy only)
There is footage of Al Neri visiting Meyer Klingman, the owner of the gambling license for Michael's new hotel, at the casino, and asking him to leave. Klingman resists, so Neri chases him through the casino into a closed auditorium, which is rehearsing for a cabaret, until Neri threatens him with a heavy chair, at which point Klingman finally capitulates and leaves the hotel. Neri then sits down in the seats and signals for the performers to go on with their rehearsal.

The Godfather Part III additional scenes 
The original introductory scene showed Michael in a meeting with Archbishop Gilday about buying International Immobiliare reminiscent of the introductory scene from The Godfather of Bonasera and Vito. The scene was moved to later in the film, with the final cut's introduction showing the Corleone house in Lake Tahoe in ruins. (Saga and Trilogy only)

References

External links 

1970s crime drama films
1977 films
1970s American television miniseries
Television series about organized crime
The Godfather films
Alternative versions of films
1977 drama films
Works about the American Mafia
Films directed by Francis Ford Coppola
1970s American films
1990s American films